Clube de Condeixa Associação Cultural e Desportiva is a Portuguese football team based in Condeixa-a-Nova, Coimbra. The club presently competes in the Divisão de Honra da Associação de Futebol de Coimbra.

History
The club was founded in 1900. In 2018, they won the Taça AF Coimbra and also won the Supertaça AF Coimbra. They repeated as champions of the Taça AF Coimbra the following season. In 2019, the club won the Divisão de Honra da Associação de Futebol de Coimbra, earning promotion to the third-tier Campeonato de Portugal. In 2021, the club was nearly promoted to the new third tier Liga 3, after advancing to the promotion stage of the Campeonato de Portugal.

League History
 2017-2018 - Divisão de Honra da Associação de Futebol de Coimbra
 2018-2019 - Divisão de Honra da Associação de Futebol de Coimbra
 2019-2020 - Campeonato de Portugal
 2020–21 - Campeonato de Portugal
 2021–22 - Campeonato de Portugal
 2022-2023 - Divisão de Honra da Associação de Futebol de Coimbra

Titles

References

Football clubs in Portugal
Association football clubs established in 1900
1900 establishments in Portugal